Ballsh-Hekal oil field is an Albanian oil field that was discovered in 1967. It is a big on-shore oil field in Albania.

See also

Oil fields of Albania

References

Oil fields of Albania
Mallakastër